The Rugby–Birmingham–Stafford line (also known as the Birmingham loop) is a railway line in the West Midlands of England. It is a loop off the West Coast Main Line (WCML) between Rugby and Stafford, via the West Midlands cities of Coventry, Birmingham and Wolverhampton. The direct route between Rugby and Stafford is the Trent Valley Line.

Places served 

These cities, towns and villages are served by the line:
 Stafford
 Penkridge
 Wolverhampton
 Coseley
 Tipton
 Dudley Port High Level – proposed interchange for the West Midlands Metro
 Sandwell
 Smethwick
 Birmingham
 Adderley Park (serving Saltley)
 Stechford
 Lea Hall
 Marston Green
 Birmingham International – for National Exhibition Centre and Birmingham Airport
 Hampton-in-Arden
 Berkswell
 Tile Hill
 Canley
 Coventry
 Rugby

Services 
A mixture of intercity, regional, cross-country and local services operate over all or parts of the route. Avanti West Coast, CrossCountry, Transport for Wales and West Midlands Trains all operate services.

 Avanti West Coast uses the route as part of their intercity service between London Euston and Birmingham New Street, some services are also extended to/from Wolverhampton, Holyhead or Scotland.
 West Midlands Trains also operate London-Birmingham regional trains over the route, all operating via .
 Transport for Wales operate regional services between Birmingham International and various destinations in Wales via Shrewsbury.
Many trains on this route run via Wolverhampton, Birmingham and Coventry, turning off towards Leamington Spa.

History 
The line from Rugby to Birmingham was opened as part of the London and Birmingham Railway, in 1838, and originally ran into its terminus at Birmingham Curzon Street. The Grand Junction Railway opened its line into Curzon Street the following year, linking Birmingham to Wolverhampton, Stafford, and the Liverpool and Manchester Railway. However, this line ran via  to Wolverhampton (see map). The London and Birmingham, and Grand Junction railways merged in 1846 to form the London and North Western Railway (LNWR). Soon after, work started on building a new, more centrally located station in Birmingham, which became known as Birmingham New Street station. Finally, on 1 July 1852, the Stour Valley Line from Wolverhampton to Birmingham via Smethwick opened. It started at Bushbury, just north of Wolverhampton where it joined the Grand Junction Railway, to Birmingham New Street. It was promoted by the Birmingham, Wolverhampton and Stour Valley Railway, which was soon absorbed by the LNWR.

The LNWR itself became part of the London, Midland and Scottish Railway (LMS) in 1923, and part of British Railways during Nationalisation in 1948.

The line was electrified along with the rest of the WCML during the late 1960s in the wake of the BR 1955 Modernisation Plan.

In 1987, British Rail commissioned artist Kevin Atherton to produce a series of sculptures to be erected along the line between Birmingham New Street station and Wolverhampton. The finished piece was titled Iron Horse, and consists of twelve different horse silhouettes, fashioned from steel. The construction material was chosen for its historic associations with the Black Country.

Many of the smaller stations on the line were closed in the 1950s and 60s, especially between Birmingham and Wolverhampton. However, some new stations were opened in the late 20th century:  station was opened in 1976 to serve Birmingham Airport and the National Exhibition Centre, and in 1995 another new station;  was opened, serving as a two-level interchange with trains on the Birmingham Snow Hill to Worcester Line.

There were also three services a day to Walsall, until a timetable change in May 2019 saw it removed and replaced by two morning services per day to Shrewsbury.

Accidents 
 1967 – Stechford rail crash; 9 killed, 16 injured.

Infrastructure 
Despite the heavy traffic carried by the line, it is only double track throughout, and heavily congested, especially between Coventry and Birmingham. In the 1930s, the London, Midland and Scottish Railway (LMS) started work on quadrupling the line between Coventry and Birmingham, however only preparatory work was carried out before the scheme was cancelled due to the outbreak of World War II. Periodic calls have been made since to quadruple the line between Coventry and Birmingham to ease congestion.

The line is electrified with overhead wires at  AC.

Future proposals
In 2023, Transport for West Midlands (TfWM) and the West Midlands Rail Executive (WMRE) put forward plans to open a new station at Binley on the line between Coventry and Rugby named Coventry East (Binley), serving the eastern part of Coventry.

References 

 Jowetts Railways Centres Volume 1, Alan Jowett (PSL, 1993)
 A Century of Railways Around Birmingham and the West Midlands, Volumes 1, 2 & 3, John Boynton (Mid England Books, 1997–1999)
 Rail Atlas of Great Britain and Ireland, S K Baker (OPC, 2004)

External links 

Railway lines in the West Midlands (region)
Rail transport in Birmingham, West Midlands
Rail transport in Coventry
Rail transport in Warwickshire
Rail transport in Wolverhampton
Rail transport in Staffordshire
Rail transport in the West Midlands (county)
Railway lines opened in 1837
Airport rail links in the United Kingdom
1837 establishments in England